Upega (Brigasc dialect: Üpega) is a frazione—similar to a hamlet—located in the comune (municipality) of Briga Alta, Province of Cuneo in the region of Piedmont, Italy. It is one of three frazioni that form Briga Alta, alongside Carnino and Piaggia. Located in the  culture, it is one of a handful of villages where the Brigasc dialect of the Ligurian language is spoken.

References 

Frazioni of the Province of Cuneo